Piazza Augusto Imperatore is an urban square in Rome (Italy) created in 1937 by the Fascist regime to enhance the Mausoleum of Augustus.

History 

The demolitions of buildings around the Mausoleum of Augustus began in 1934, following the Rome Master Plan approved in 1931, with the aim, typical of the Fascist regime, to celebrate the monuments of Ancient Rome.
The architectural isolation of the Mausoleum from the other buildings was obtained through a large demolition work, which destroyed about 120 buildings (the former San Rocco Hospital among others) on an area of about  up to Lungotevere in Augusta, similarly to other building projects carried out throughout the city in those years, such as Via della Conciliazione and Via dell'Impero. The design of the square is due to Vittorio Ballio Morpurgo, but Massimo Piacentini (first cousin of the more famous Marcello) was also involved in it.

To enhance the monument, the square was surrounded by the three new large headquarters of the INPS, in the rationalist style, which were built in 1938 on the north, east and south sides. The west side, in the area of the former Port of Ripetta (no longer existing at that time), was occupied by a celebratory structure made of glass and concrete, which housed the restored Ara Pacis Augustae: this first temporary structure, designed by Morpurgo on the occasion of the Bimillennium of Augustus in 1938, was replaced only in 2006 by the present edifice designed by Richard Meier, which houses the Museum of the Ara Pacis.

The works were definitively stopped only in 1952, following the mobilization of Italia Nostra which criticized the plans for a further development of the square.

In the summer of 2020, a new construction site was opened for an overall urban re-development of the square, with an expected duration of 2 years.

See also
Mausoleum of Augustus
Ara Pacis
 Museum of the Ara Pacis
INPS buildings at Piazza Augusto Imperatore

Notes

Bibliography 
 
 Betti, Fabio, D'Amelio Angela Maria, and Rossella Leone, Mausoleo di Augusto: demolizioni e scavi; fotografie 1928/1941, Electa, 2011.

External links 
 

Augusto Imperatore
Rome R. IV Campo Marzio
Fascist architecture